The Memoirs of Lady Hyegyeong is an autobiographical manuscript written by Lady Hyegyeong of Joseon that details her life during the years she was confined to Changgyeong Palace. The Memoirs of Lady Hyegyong, or its direct translation Records Written in Silence (Korean: Hanjungnok), is a collection of four autobiographical memoirs written by Lady Hyegyong (6 August 1735 – 13 January 1816), also known as Queen Heongyeong of the Joseon Dynasty. The Memoirs of Lady Hyegyong consist of four memoirs that were written within a ten-year period from 1795 to 1805, depicting Lady Hyegyong's life before and after being chosen to marry Crown Prince Sado.

The memoirs discuss Crown Prince Sado's descent into violent madness until his execution was ordered by his father, King Yeongjo. Although Lady Hyegyong's descriptions of her husband's madness and execution are the most famous parts of her collection, each of Lady Hyegyong's four memoirs center around a different aspect of her life and have a different political purpose.

Structure
The memoirs include four distinct pieces written in 1795, 1801, 1802, and 1805. Each piece was written for a slightly different purpose and audience, the earliest being the most personal and the following pieces gradually becoming directed to the public.

They detail Lady Hyegyeong's life during the years she was confined to Changgyeong Palace, including her marriage to Prince Sado, his descent into madness, and his death by decree of his father King Yeongjo. The memoirs have been translated into English by JaHyun Kim Haboush.

Significance
In its entirety, The Memoirs of Lady Hyegyong is an important historical primary source. Lady Hyegyong's memoirs are some of the only pre-modern autobiographies written by a woman in East Asia. The significance of Lady Hyegyong's memoirs, however, extends past the fact that they were written by a woman. By the time at which Lady Hyegyong began writing her memoirs, female narratives had started to appear in increased quantity in Korea. Long before Lady Hyegyong began writing her memoirs, Korean script (hangeul) had already become the voice of women and the uneducated ever since its invention by Sejong the Great in the later half of the 15th century.

By the time Lady Hyegyong had begun writing in the late 1700s, the invention of hangul had already become the voice of female narratives, which began to appear and allowed female narratives to become more and more plentiful. Haboush determines this increase to be correlated with the decrease of yangban women's inheritance rights. As family structures began to change, women turned to the pen "to bear public witness to history" and express for themselves how customs and family structures were changing at the time. Similarly, by writing her own autobiographical memoirs, Lady Hyegyong was able to express for herself insights into life at the Joseon Court during an extraordinary time.

As a woman at court, Lady Hyegyong provided details that official court records could not. Due to the fact that women were unable to become truly public figures, their narratives typically discussed the private realm as opposed to the public realm, which in this case would be the actual political scene of the court. Whereas men who served at the court along with the Annals of the Joseon Court served to record matter to the public record, Lady Hyegyong, as a woman, was able to explore the private realm of the court. As such, she was able to include into her memoirs her own private interpretation of politics at the time as well as personal details regarding the court's dynamics. Lady Hyegyong's ability to provide to those who read her memoirs a nuanced and vivid view of the royal family and royalty, such as King Yeongjo, King Jeongjo, and Princess Hwawan, is part of what makes The Memoirs of Lady Hyegyong such a rich primary source. Especially at the time when her memoirs became available to the Korean public, Lady Hyegyong's portrayal of royal figures was distinct. Royal figures were traditionally portrayed as exalted, moral figures in order to legitimize their reign. However, Lady Hyegyong's depictions of the Joseon Court offer a frank juxtaposition to the more formal portrayal of royal figures by court documents of the time. Through Lady Hyegyong's lack of fear when discussing the imperfections of the royal family and court's decisions, she reveals a more human side of palace life. Her decision to portray politicians and royal figures in a personal way comes from her desire to defend her natal family members, especially her uncle and brother who had been executed due to accusations of disloyalty. In order to absolve her family members, Lady Hyegyong forthcomingly discusses the qualities of court life she believes led to her uncle's and brother's executions.

Personal Background
While The Memoirs of Lady Hyegyong are an important historical source, it is important to note that each memoir was written by Lady Hyegyong with a specific political purpose in mind. Even before Lady Hyegyong married into the royal family, her natal family, the P'ungsan Hong family, were famous as scholars and public servants. As such, for a woman of her time, Lady Hyegyong was extremely well educated. The Memoirs of Lady Hyegyong shows Lady Hyegyong's own considerable research into the proper structure used for literary works such as the ones she was writing at the time, including letters, court novels, and testimonials. Through Lady Hyegyong's own research and literary pursuits, she was able to delve into a realm of politics formerly reserved for men.

As a Confucian wife, Lady Hyegyong was considered obligated to her husband and her husband's family, who she says she can not say an "unjust" word about without being "unable to avoid the most cruel death by the gods of Heaven". Lady Hyegyong explicitly acknowledges this bias in her fourth memoir, stating that she is both "deeply indebted to [King Yeongjo]" and that "her devotion to [Crown Prince Sado] reaches as high as the Heavens". Her stress of this obligation, however, can be interpreted as a way to legitimize her writing; by explicitly stressing her duty to the Yi line, she implies that all her writing regarding the royal family is 'just' and fair as she is morally indebted to them.

However, as the purpose of her earlier memoirs is to defend her natal family from accusations of disloyalty, it is impossible to say if all the content of Lady Hyegyong's memoirs is accurate. Despite the fluidity of Lady Hyegyong's narration, she was not in person for some of the content of her memoirs. Instead, Lady Hyegyong's narration smoothly transitions between events she experienced for herself, events she heard of at the time she was at court, and events that happened before her time that she relied completely on other's personal accounts for.

JaHyun Kim Haboush for example, was able to verify one example of an inaccuracy in Lady Hyegyong's description of her younger brother's birth. When introducing her brother's birthday, Lady Hyegyong gives the wrong date. According to Haboush, this might have been an attempt to protect her mother from slander as the year her brother was born suggests that he was conceived at a time when Lady Hyegyong's mother should have been in mourning for her mother and father-in-law. When a person was in mourning, they were supposed to be sexually abstinent. As such, if Lady Hyegyong's brother was conceived during her mother's mourning period, Lady Hyegyong's mother could be accused of being unfilial.

Format of The Memoir of 1795
Lady Hyegyong's first memoir was dedicated to her nephew, the heir of her natal family, the Hong family. Her first memoir, The Memoir of 1795, was written in the form of an injunction designed to defend her father and herself for their actions before and after Crown Prince Sado's execution. This memoir was devoted to her life as a whole, with emphasis on the transition she had to make from her idyllic childhood to the treacherous eighteenth century Joseon court.

As a family injunction, Lady Hyegyong's memoir is unique both due to her gender and style of narration. Typically, family injunctions are written by men; as such, Lady Hyegyong's nephew's request that she write the injunction was unusual. However, given Lady Hyegyong's position within the Joseon court as well as how educated she was, the exception was not entirely strange.

Furthermore, to guarantee the privacy of the court and her position, Lady Hyegyong's parents destroyed any and all written communication from her to them or vice versa. On a personal level, it makes sense that her nephew and family wanted to document her life once she reaches her later years, especially given how her membership in the court influenced the Hong family line.

Lady Hyegyong focuses her injunction primarily on defending both herself and her father's decision not to commit suicide or leave office after Crown Prince Sado's execution. While The Memoir of 1795 fits the format of an injunction by defending her father, the actual narration of Lady Hyegyong's first memoir departs from a typical family injunction due to raw emotions conveyed in the text. Whereas family injunctions usually have more of a neutral narration designed to offer the wisdom of elders to a younger generation, Lady Hyegyong's memoir tends to offer up her own emotional reaction looking back on her life and those who played a part in it. As JaHyun Kim Haboush, the English translator of her Memoirs discusses, Lady Hyegyong's first memoir reads less as direct advice to her nephew and more of an impassioned defense of both her and her family in the face of the numerous accusations and scandals they faced during her lifetime.

Content of the Memoir of 1795
The Memoir of 1795 focuses on Lady Hyegyong's transition from life with her natal family to life as a member of the royal family. According to palace tradition, Lady Hyegyong was invited to the royal palace as a young child along with other girls whose names were put forth for royal selection. Despite the fact that there were multiple screenings before the final selection, Lady Hyegyong asserts that she was favored since her first introduction to the royal family, noting both King Yeongjo and Queen Jeongseong seemed to immediately favor her. Lady Hyegyong describes her introduction to life away from her parents as traumatic, noting the distance it put between her and her family members who now treated her formally. She also stresses her regret that her position at court encouraged her family members to become involved with court politics.

The Memoir of 1795 emphasizes the love and dedication both Lady Hyegyong and her father had for the royal family, especially pertaining to Sado and Jeongjo. By stressing these personal relationships, Lady Hyegyong asserts her and her father's loyalty in order to defend their reaction to Sado's execution. Throughout the memoir, Lady Hyegyong highlights her and her family's dedication to serving her son. It is through this argument she explains her and her father's decision to live and stay at court in order to serve Jeongjo as well as protect the dynastic line. After describing the aftermath of Sado's execution, Lady Hyegyong states, "Like me, [my father's] only thought and concern was to protect the Grand Heir, and so, for the sake of the nation, he controlled his sorrow and did not retire from office". By portraying herself and her father this way, Lady Hyegyong passionately defends their family's integrity to the Hong family's next patriarch.

Format of The Memoir of 1801
Lady Hyegyong's second memoir, The Memoir of 1801, was written in protest the execution of her brother on false charges of converting to Catholicism as well as her uncle's execution due to accusations of disloyalty against Jeongjo's regency. As was typical in the period it was written, The Memoir of 1801 was written in a manner resembling a memorial, the literary format typically used to express outrage. As JaHyun Kim Haboush describes, "... there is a category [of memorials sent to the throne] reserved for those who felt aggrieved about something concerning themselves or persons close to them such as family members or mentors. Their memorials tended to be narratives in which the authors refuted unfavorable accounts by presenting contrary evidence and displaying appropriate emotion".

In order to do so, memorials tended to be narratives expressing outrage and offering a counter-argument to a court decision. For example, in this case, Lady Hyegyong attributes her brother's execution to be due to factionalism from within the Joseon court, not his conversion to Catholicism which she claims is false. What is especially unique about Lady Hyegyong's decision to write a memorial in defense of her brother and uncle is the format she chose. Not only did she write her memorial in Korean, but she also transformed a political tool by choosing to personally address a King over a personal grievance. While memorials were traditionally used by male politicians to discuss public politics, Lady Hyegyong instead uses the format of a memorial to raise a private issue as the current King's grandmother.

Content of the Memoir of 1801
Although Lady Hyegyong's Memoir of 1801 focuses on clearing the names of her brother and uncle, in doing so, she reveals the Joseon court's corruption and issues at the time. Lady Hyegyong attributes a great deal of her and her family's suffering at the Joseon Court to be due to factionalism, mainly at the hands of one Madam Jeong. Even before the events detailed in The Memoir of 1795, King Yeongjo had attempted to implement anti-factionalism at court. Despite his own intentions, King Yeongjo's favoritism towards Madam Jeong since a young age allowed her and her family to amass a great deal of influence. A large part of The Memoir of 1801's content was dedicated to Lady Hyegyong exposing to the public the various attempts by Madam Jeong to manipulate court factions against the Hong family. Lady Hyegyong claims that through Madam Jeong's various schemes she was able to turn Jeongjo against both Lady Hyegyong and her family, culminating in her brother's and uncle's executions (Haboush, "Memoirs" p. 142).

At the height of Madam Jeong's power, Lady Hyegyong asserts that she had enough influence over Jeongjo to prevent him from even becoming intimate with his wife. Furthermore, as Madam Jeong's son became more powerful at court and closer to Jeongjo, his claims to the court that the Hong family was falling out of favor with Jeongjo encouraged other political figures to send their own memorials attacking them. Lady Hyegyong attributes that this negative influence from Madam Jeong and other antagonistic political figures lead to the charges against her brother and uncle to escalate to the point where they were sentenced for execution.

Format of the Memoir of 1802
The Memoir of 1802 offers a look into the life of her son, King Jeongjo, as a young boy grappling with the execution of his father, Crown Prince Sado. Lady Hyegyong wrote her third memoir after Jeongjo's sudden death. Addressed to her grandson King Sunjo, Lady Hyegyong uses the memoir to introduce Jeongo's plan to restore honor both to Sado and the Hong family, which he had died before implementing. Jeongjo specifically designed his plan to be put into place by Sunjo, who he charged to give full honors to both Sado and Lady Hyegyong after taking the throne—however this never came to fruition due to Jeongjo's death.

Although Lady Hyegyong chose to format her third memoir as a biography, she privatises the genre by exploring Jeongjo's character as a filial son dedicated to restoring his family's honor as opposed to a political figure. Through Lady Hyegyong's portrayal of Jeongjo as a filial son, she uses her memoir as a persuasive piece designed to encourage Sunjo to continue Jeongjo's plan of restoring honor to her family. By stressing Jeongjo's filiality to his father, she implies that Sunjo should show the same filiality to Jeongjo by completing what Jeongjo had left unfinished.

Content of the Memoir of 1802
The Memoir of 1802 focuses on Jeongjo's reaction to Sado's death and his subsequent attempts to restore honor to his name. Lady Hyegyong uses her memoir to offer a very personal view of Jeongjo as a filial son dedicated not only to his family but also who championed against factionalism and corruption. Describing Jeongjo as "peerless in benevolence," throughout her memoir she gives various examples of Jeongjo's filiality, claiming he "served [her] with all the wealth and splendor available to the throne, yet he did not think it enough" and "still regretted he could not pay respect to his father morning and evening".

While her memoir mainly focuses on Jeongjo, Lady Hyegyong once again uses her memoir to stress her father's capability and good nature as well as factionalism at court. In fact, Lady Hyegyong claims that the fact the Jeongjo realized her father's innocent nature and regretted his earlier actions proved his intelligence. Lady Hyegyong also specifically mentions court rumors professing that her father suggested using the rice chest to execute Sado, declaring that Jeongjo dismissed them as "ridiculous" as "[he] had witnessed [the execution] with his own eyes. By reinforcing her own assertions of her family's innocence with Jeongjo's own words, Lady Hyegyong further implies that it is Sunjo's filial duty to support their beliefs by clearing Sado and the Hong family's names.

Format of the Memoir of 1805
The Memoir of 1805 offers a personal account of her husband, Crown Prince Sado, describing his eventual madness and execution. While all of Lady Hyegyong's memoirs are viewed as legitimate historical documentation of the 18th century Joseon court both, The Memoir of 1805 is particularly important due to public speculation surrounding Sado's execution or, as it came to be called, "the 1762 incident." Detailed in Lady Hyegyong's Memoir of 1805, Crown Prince Sado lived to be 27 years of age before his execution was ordered by his father, King Yeongjo. Sado's execution was ordered due to gross accusations of misconduct, including the unprovoked physical abuse, rape, and murder of servants. However, due to a memorial sent to King Yeongjo by Jeongjo, the sections of the Records of the Royal Secretariat detailing to Sado's actions and execution were destroyed. With their erasure, conspiracy theories surfaced regarding whether or not Crown Prince Sado actually committed crimes worthy of his execution as well as who conceptualized his gruesome manner of execution.

At the time when such conspiracy theories developed, Lady Hyegyong was the only significant person still alive that witnessed Sado's execution. With her moral obligations as a member of the royal family, Lady Hyegyong felt personally responsible to share her knowledge of what happened with the public, especially so her grandson could have an accurate depiction of his family history. In The Memoir of 1805, Lady Hyegyong explicitly states that her intention in writing her final memoir was to ensure that her grandson, King Sunjo, was made aware of the actual events surrounding Sado's execution. When introducing the memoir, Lady Hyegyong outright addresses the conspiracy theories surrounding Sado, calling them "false and groundless". Lady Hyegyong claimed that if she died and leave King Sunjo uneducated about his direct ancestors was "outside normal human sentiment" and would leave him in "shameful ignorance". As such, Lady Hyegyong's created what would become a legitimate primary source with which to dispel rumors surrounding Sado's execution.

In addition, Lady Hyegyong uses her memoir to discuss why she and her child, Jeongjo, lived on after Sado's execution. Traditionally, when the male head of a household was executed as a criminal, his wife and children are expected to follow him in death. Pertaining to this norm, however, Crown Prince Sado's execution was far from normal. For one, the gruesome manner in which Crown Prince Sado was executed was not out of cruelty but due to circumstance. If Crown Prince Sado was executed as criminals normally were, his son, the remaining heir to the throne would be executed as well as the rest of his family.

Furthermore, if Sado was executed as a criminal, even if Jeongjo was not forced to be executed as well, his reputation would be stained as a criminal, tarnishing the moral integrity of the royal line. As such, a traditional criminal execution had to be somehow subverted. As such, the cruel and unusual manner that Sado was executed was in order to ensure that the royal family line remained legitimate. Meanwhile, if Lady Hyegyong chose to commit suicide, as was considered appropriate after one's husband was executed, it would further incriminate Sado's line as criminals, because it would be seen as further confirmation guilt. To further ensure that Jeongjo's reputation was not affected by Sado's actions, King Yeongjo also declared Jeongjo to be the adoptive son of Sado's long dead older brother.

Content of the Memoir of 1805
Although Lady Hyegyong admits to being biased due to her devotion as Sado's wife, she nonetheless describes Sado as intelligent, compassionate, and handsome. Lady Hyegyong attributes Sado's descent into madness and violence to be mainly due to his failed relationship with his father, King Yeongjo, as opposed having an innate evil nature. One of the first aspects that Lady Hyegyong contributed to Sado's eventual madness was the fact that, since his birth, Sado was sequestered almost immediately away from his parents to live in the Chosung Pavilion, the traditional home of crown princes. Although this was traditionally done as a way to officially declare a Grand Heir, it also meant Sado was raised by eunuchs and palace women as opposed to his actual parents, servants Lady Hyegyong described as "unpleasant and peculiar".

While his parents visited often at first, as Sado grew older he saw them less and less (Haboush, "Memoirs" p. 245). This was attributed by Lady Hyegyong to also be due to factionalism at court; she notes that the servants attending to Crown Prince Sado also served Gyeongjong, the previous King whom Yeongjo was accused of poisoning. She asserts that the servants were so rude to King Yeongjo and Lady Yi that it discouraged them from visiting the Pavilion. While Lady Hyegyong pondered why Yeongjo refused to replace them, Haboush notes that Yeongjo likely feared that by replacing Gyeongjong's servants, he would face rumors questioning his loyalty to his late brother. Lady Hyegyong also attributed Sado's abnormalities to be due to her belief that the Pavilion was cursed (Haboush, "Memoirs" p. 246). The Pavilion was the previous residence of a consort of Yeongjo's father, Lady Chang, who was believed to have killed Queen Inhyon using black magic (Haboush, "Memoirs" p. 246). Lady Hyegyong believed that this supernatural influence negatively affected Sado's development (Haboush, "Memoirs" p. 246).

Although Lady Hyegyong claimed Sado was an initially a good student, his fear of his father prevented him from expressing himself clearly, leading to King Yeongjo continually admonishing him. As Sado did not see his father often and when he did Yeongjo's criticism grew increasingly harsh, Sado began to fear his father more and more. As Sado grew older, Lady Hyegyong believed his madness began to express itself due to his fear of his father as she describes the first time Sado became violent to take place after being criticized by his father in front of a large crowd.

The first person Lady Hyegyong saw Sado kill was a eunuch who he beheaded and brought the head to show her and her ladies-in-waiting. After this incidence, she describes his behavior to escalate. Although she does not give any specific numbers of how many Sado killed or raped, she says it was so many that she could not remember. While she said he was not violent to her, Lady Hyegyong noted he would beat any women who resisted his sexual overtures until he "rent their flesh" and they gave in. Despite the intensity of Crown Prince Sado's violence, Lady Hyegyong only gives one incident in which he harmed her by throwing a go board at her head, injuring her eye (Haboush, "Memoirs" p. 297). That said, she expressed that "the situation was so difficult that [she] was in constant danger, to the point of not knowing when [her] life would end". At the height of his violence, every day bodies and injured people had to be carried from the palace. As a crown princess, Lady Hyegyong's duties included replacing those injured and killed by Sado as well as compensating for the aftermath of his violence.

In one instance, after Crown Prince Sado left the royal palace without approval, Lady Hyegyong, along with some of Sado's head eunuchs, created an elaborate ruse to disguise Sado's absence; the ruse involved the head eunuch pretending to be ill while locked up in Sado's chambers while being served by the rest of his servants as if he was actually the crown prince (Haboush, "Memoirs" p. 303). Despite the danger scheme placed upon them, Lady Hyegyong described Sado's absent to be viewed as a "welcomed respite".

As Sado grew older, his pervasive fear and anger spread to other parts of his life. Although unknown to Lady Hyegyong, courtroom scripts of King Yeongjo and Crown Prince Sado's interactions revealed Yeongjo scolding Sado that "thunder on the previous night was a warning that [Sado] should develop moral virtue". Afterwards, Lady Hyegyong describes Sado becoming so afraid of thunder he would lie on the ground until the storm was over. She also claims Sado's fear grew so intense he became too afraid to even look at the character for thunder. Sado also developed a phobia of clothing that required him to burn clothing as part of a ritual.

Lady Hyegyong also asserted that as Sado grew more and more afraid of his father, he also began becoming more obsessed and taking longer to get dressed. Due to Sado's phobia of clothing, he used immense amounts of clothing, so much that his stipend as a crown prince could not cover the expenses. As Sado's wife, a large part of Lady Hyegyong's life at court was consumed by compensating for his mental illness. The expenses created by his phobia were great enough that Lady Hyegyong was forced to depend on her father to lend her money to buy clothes as well as spend a large amount of her own time mending new clothes. Furthermore, due to his mental illness, Sado's process for getting dressed was not just time and money consuming but sometimes deadly. Lady Hyegyong claimed if servants "made the slightest error" in helping him, "people were hurt, even killed". Even his favorite consort, a woman named Bingae who birthed several of his children, was beaten to death after Sado became irritated while trying to get dressed.

As Sado's crimes began to escalate, King Yeongjo eventually learned of his actions. Although King Yeongjo orchestrated a meeting between himself and his son in order to confront him, no repercussions were ordered as Sado attributed his actions to be due to being "sad that [Yeongjo] does not love [him] and terrified when [Yeongjo] criticizes [Sado]". Instead the confrontation ended with Yeongjo promising to support him better. Although King Yeongjo learned of Sado's actions and received his direct confession, it was only after his mother, Lady Sonhui, learned of his growing madness that he faced punishment. After a rumor reached the court that Sado intended to assassinate his father, Lady Hyegyong received a note from Lady Sonhui announcing that she had to protect the dynasty and the royal Heir. Shortly afterwards, Sado was executed by being locked into a rice chest where he was left to die.

Popular culture
 The novel The Red Queen by Margaret Drabble is based on the memoirs.
 Lady Hyegyeong was played by Choi Myung-gil in the 1988 MBC TV series The Memoirs of Lady Hyegyeong.
 Lady Hyegyeong was played by Hong Ri-na in the 1988 MBC TV series The King of the Wind.
 Lady Hyegyeong was played by Ha Hee-ra in the 1998 KBS TV series Heaven Heaven.
 Lady Hyegyeong was played by Jung Ae-ri in the 2007 CGV cable miniseries Eight Days, Assassination Attempts against King Jeongjo.
 Lady Hyegyeong was played by Kyeon Mi-ri in the 2007 MBC TV series Yi San.
 Lady Hyegyeong was played by Kim Sung-ryung in the 2014 film The Fatal Encounter.
 Lady Hyegyeong was played by Park Eun-bin in the 2014 SBS TV series Secret Door.
 Lady Hyegyeong was played by Moon Geun-young in the 2015 film The Throne.

See also

 List of monarchs of Korea
 History of Korea

References

Joseon dynasty works